Wendell White may refer to:
Wendell White (cricketer) (born 1964), Bermudian cricketer
Wendell White (basketball) (born 1984), American basketball player